Rehal is a hamlet situated in Nauhatta block and located in Rohtas district of Bihar, India. It is one of 68 villages in Nauhatta Block along with villages like Bhurwa and Dewadand.

References

External links
Rehal Bihar
The Rehal hamlet

Villages in Rohtas district